Street Survivors is the fifth studio album by the Southern rock band Lynyrd Skynyrd, released on October 17, 1977. The LP is the last Skynyrd album recorded by original members Ronnie Van Zant and Allen Collins, and is the sole Skynyrd studio recording by guitarist Steve Gaines. Three days after the album's release, the band's chartered airplane crashed en route to Baton Rouge, Louisiana, killing the pilot, co-pilot, the group's assistant road-manager and three band members (Van Zant, Gaines, and Gaines' older sister, backup singer Cassie Gaines), and severely injuring most who survived the crash.

The album was an instant success, achieving gold certification just 10 days after its release. It would later go double platinum. The album performed well on the charts, peaking at #5 (the band's highest-charting album), as did the singles "What's Your Name" and "That Smell," the former a top-20 hit on the singles chart.

Background
The album was recorded twice, once with Tom Dowd at the helm at Criteria Studios in Miami, Florida, and then at Studio One in Doraville, Georgia, five months later with uncredited co-producers Kevin Elson and Rodney Mills. The Doraville recording was used for the initial release of the album. In March 2008, the album was re-issued with these alternate versions of most of the songs. Differences are minor on some songs, with the major difference being a much slower and extended earlier version of "That Smell." Also included are two songs recorded for, but not included on the original album, "Georgia Peaches" and "Sweet Little Missy," with the latter being included twice, in demo and final form. Also included is a version of "Honky Tonk Night Time Man," with Ronnie's alternate autobiographical vocal take, entitled "Jacksonville Kid," which is believed to be the last vocal take he ever recorded in a studio.

The song "One More Time" was added to the album, presumably after it was decided to drop one of the two tracks above. However, this song is the original recording from their 1971 Muscle Shoals demo; it was not re-recorded for this album. Hence it features Greg Walker and Rickey Medlocke in place of Leon Wilkeson and Artimus Pyle.

Street Survivors was a showcase for guitarist/vocalist Steve Gaines, who had joined the band just a year earlier on the recommendation of his sister Cassie. Publicly and privately, Ronnie Van Zant marveled at the multiple talents of Skynyrd's newest member, claiming that the band would "all be in his shadow one day." Gaines' contributions included his co-lead vocal with Van Zant on the co-written "You Got That Right" and the guitar boogie "I Know A Little," which Gaines had written before he joined Skynyrd. So confident was Skynyrd's leader of Gaines' abilities, that the album (and some concerts) featured Gaines delivering his self-penned blues "Ain't No Good Life" - one of the few songs in the first incarnation Skynyrd catalog to feature a lead vocalist other than Van Zant. The album also included the hit singles "What's Your Name" and the ominous "That Smell" - a cautionary tale about drug abuse that seemed to be aimed at fellow band members (both Collins and Gary Rossington had serious car accidents which slowed the recording of the album).

Plane crash

On October 20, 1977, only three days after the release of Street Survivors, and five shows into their most successful headlining tour to date, Lynyrd Skynyrd's chartered Convair CV-300 ran out of fuel near the end of their flight from Greenville, South Carolina, where they had just performed at the Greenville Memorial Auditorium, to LSU in Baton Rouge, Louisiana. Though the pilots attempted an emergency landing on a small airstrip, the plane crashed in a forest five miles (8 km) northeast of Gillsburg, Mississippi. Ronnie Van Zant, Steve Gaines, Cassie Gaines, assistant road manager Dean Kilpatrick, pilot Walter McCreary, and co-pilot William Gray, were killed on impact. The other band members (Collins, Rossington, Wilkeson, Powell, Pyle, and Hawkins), tour manager Ron Eckerman, and road crew survived, but suffered serious injuries.

Following the crash and the ensuing press, Street Survivors became the band's second platinum album and reached No. 5 on the U.S. album chart. The single "What's Your Name?" reached No. 13 on the single airplay charts in January 1978.

The original cover sleeve for Street Survivors had featured a photograph of the band standing on a city street with all its buildings engulfed in flames, some near the center nearly obscuring Steve Gaines's face. After the plane crash, this cover became highly controversial. Out of respect for the deceased (and at the request of Teresa Gaines, Steve's widow), MCA Records withdrew the original cover and replaced it with a similar image of the band against a simple black background, which was on the back cover of the original sleeve. An urban legend has long claimed that only those band members touched by flame in the photograph were killed in the crash, but this is not true (flame appears to touch nearly all band members). Thirty years later, for the deluxe CD version of Street Survivors, the original "flames" cover was restored.

Track listing

All tracks were previously unreleased except where noted.

Live tracks recorded August 24, 1977 at the Selland Arena in Fresno, California.

Personnel
Lynyrd Skynyrd
Ronnie Van Zant – lead vocals  
Steve Gaines – guitar, backing vocals, lead vocal on "Ain't No Good Life", co-lead vocals on "You Got That Right"
Allen Collins – guitar
Gary Rossington – guitar
Leon Wilkeson – bass, backing vocals
Artimus Pyle – drums
Billy Powell – keyboards

Additional personnel
The Honkettes (JoJo Billingsley, Cassie Gaines, Leslie Hawkins) – backing vocals on "That Smell" and "One More Time"
Ed King – guitar on "One More Time"
Greg T. Walker – bass on "One More Time"
Rickey Medlocke – drums, backing vocals on "One More Time"
Tim Smith – backing vocals on "One More Time"
Barry Lee Harwood – dobro on "Honky Tonk Night Time Man"

Chart positions

Certifications

References

Lynyrd Skynyrd albums
1977 albums
MCA Records albums
Albums produced by Tom Dowd
Albums produced by Kevin Elson
Albums recorded at Muscle Shoals Sound Studio